Lockwood is an area of Huddersfield, in the Metropolitan Borough of Kirklees, West Yorkshire, England.

History
Lockwood was originally called North Crosland and part of the Crosland family estate. However, it was taken over by the Lockwood family after a series of disputes between the dynasties. Parts of the area are still known as North Crosland.

Lockwood railway station is on the Penistone Line between Huddersfield and Sheffield. It is situated in Swan Lane, just before the Grade II-listed, 32-arched Lockwood Viaduct, which spans the valley and connects the line to Berry Brow. Prior to the mid-1970s it had its own extensive goods yard, coal yard, sidings and station master's house.

The goods yards were used to service and supply raw materials to the former engineering works of David Brown Ltd. This particular division of David Brown's produced gearboxes for industrial machinery and hydraulic drives and some military armoured vehicles.

A branch line from the station, just before the railway viaduct, went via Armitage Bridge and Netherton to Meltham. This passed Meltham Mills, where David Brown Ltd. had a tractor manufacturing facility.  The former station master's house is now a private residence and the goods yards are part of a timber merchant's.

Lockwood is the manufacturing base of locally renowned Dixon's Milk Ices, housed in the former Lockwood Town Hall.

The Huddersfield Rugby Union Football Club, at Lockwood Park, is situated below and to both sides of the railway viaduct, in the former 'Bentley & Shaws' Brewery.

Lockwood Brewery
Timothy Bentley, founder of 'Bentley & Shaws' Lockwood Brewery, is recognised as the inventor of the Stone Square system of brewing beer. This method allowed high levels of carbon dioxide to remain in the beer during fermentation, helping to give it a unique flavour and smoothness when served.  The stone used in the brewery came from stone quarries in Elland.

The brewery was taken over by Bass Charrington before it closed down in the late 1960s.

See also
Listed buildings in Crosland Moor and Netherton
Listed buildings in Huddersfield (Newsome Ward - outer areas)

References

External links

 Virtual Huddersfield - Lockwood
 Huddersfield Rugby Union Club
 Picture of David Browns Works - Geograph.org

Villages in West Yorkshire
Holme Valley
Areas of Huddersfield